DNASTAR is a global bioinformatics software company incorporated in 1984 that is headquartered in Madison, Wisconsin. DNASTAR develops and sells software for sequence analysis in the fields of genomics, molecular biology, and structural biology under the name Lasergene.

Software
Lasergene software first gained popularity in the 1980s and 1990s for its sequence assembly and analysis capabilities of Sanger sequencing data. In 2007, additional Lasergene applications were added to support next-generation sequencing and structural biology. 

The latest versions of the software are Lasergene 17.3. (released August 2021) and Lasergene 17.4. (released November 2022). DNASTAR software is available for desktop computers running Mac OS X, Windows, and Linux as well as for use on Amazon Web Services.

DNASTAR's next-gen software allows the user to assemble, align, analyze and visualize genomic short and long read sequencing data from Illumina, Ion Torrent, Oxford Nanopore Technologies, and Pacific Biosciences. Lasergene's use in next-generation sequence assembly and analysis was contributed as a chapter, written by company scientists, to the 2008 book Next Generation Genome Sequencing edited by Michael Janitz.

DNASTAR software has been cited over 84,000 times in peer-reviewed journals and is currently utilized by over 80,000 pharmaceutical, biotechnology, academic, and clinical researchers around the world .

Reviews and Accolades
In 2007, DNASTAR was awarded a Reader's Choice Gold Award by Scientific Computing Magazine for the Lasergene sequence analysis software.

The 2008 book Inventing Entrepreneurs: Technology Innovators and their Entrepreneurial Journey by Gerard George and Adam J. Bock includes DNASTAR as an example of an innovative and entrepreneurial success story.

A research study by BMC Genomics in 2010 determined that SeqMan (DNASTAR's next-gen sequence assembly application) assemblies performed best, with more novel sequences and better recapitulation of transcripts.

Another BMC Genomics study in 2011 determined that the best overall contig performance resulted from a SeqMan NGen assembly.

Writing in The Scientist in 2014, David R. Smith gave positive reviews to several bioinformatics software packages including DNASTAR, but said that his bioinformatics skills plateaued and the licensing and upgrading costs were a significant proportion of his lab's operating budget.

Writing in the California Journal of Health Promotion in 2018, Jonathan Chacon et al. (all from the University of California-Fullerton) gave generally positive reviews to both Lasergene SeqMan NGen and CLCbio Genomics Workbench for their comparative de novo transcriptome workflows and discussed the strengths and weaknesses of each application.

Customers

 National Institutes of Health
 National Cancer Institute
 Harvard University
 University of Michigan School of Medicine
 Wellcome Trust Sanger Institute
 Cincinnati Children's Hospital
 Scripps Research Libraries
 Emory University
 University of Wisconsin
 University of California-Irvine
 Columbia University
 Washington University School of Medicine in St. Louis
 Yale School of Medicine
 University of Pittsburgh
 University of Iowa
 Duke University
 Virginia Tech
 University of North Carolina School of Medicine
 Florida State University
 University of Georgia
 Norwegian University of Science and Technology
 University of Münster
 University of Sussex

See also
List of bioinformatics companies
Database of Macromolecular Motions

References

External links

Bioinformatics software
American companies established in 1984
Research support companies